"For Those Who Think Young" is the first episode of the second season of the American television drama series Mad Men. It was written by series creator Matthew Weiner and directed by Tim Hunter. The episode originally aired on AMC in the United States on July 27, 2008.

Plot
The episode begins on Valentine's Day, Wednesday, February 14, 1962, picking up 15 months after the season 1 finale.

Don visits the doctor for a checkup and learns that his blood pressure is high and that due to his age (36), he needs to slow down on his two-pack, five-drink per day diet. Peggy is back at work, after taking a break for three months and is much thinner. Others in the office are curious about her absence and weight loss. Roger has recovered from his heart attack and is back at the Sterling Cooper as well. Betty has begun taking horseback riding lessons. A new copy machine is delivered to the office, and Joan struggles to decide where to put it.

While waiting for Don, who is late for the noon meeting, Peggy berates and humiliates Don's new secretary, Lois. When Don finally arrives, they discuss pitching to Mohawk Airlines- following Duck Phillips' plan for Sterling Cooper to acquire an airline business. Don dislikes Paul's humorous copy ideas, and instead tells the staff to focus on the feeling of leaving the city, of adventure, of escape, and of going somewhere you have never been. 

On Valentine's Night, Don takes Betty to the Savoy Hotel. While there, they run into Juanita, an old roommate of Betty's from her modeling days, accompanied by an older business executive. Don points out to Betty that Juanita is clearly now working as a call girl. When Pete arrives home that night, he finds Trudy upset because she is having trouble getting pregnant. He tries to console her. In the Drapers' hotel room, a more confident Betty shows Don a sexy merry widow she has bought. The boldness throws Don, and when they try to have sex, he is impotent. The evening ends with Betty and Don watching the Jackie Kennedy TV special, A Tour of the White House with Mrs. John F. Kennedy. Also watching the special is Joan Holloway and her new doctor-boyfriend, and Salvatore Romano, who is newly married. Pete sits alone watching cartoons, eating the chocolates he purchased for his wife.

Peggy and Salvatore meet with Don to show him their new mockups of the Mohawk campaign. Don rejects their sexy copy idea, to Peggy's frustration. He insists to her that, "You are the product. You, feeling something. That's what sells." He urges them to emphasize the cute little girl running to the plane to greet her father in the ad's artwork- citing a Valentine Sally made him. Peggy thinks of the tagline: "What did you bring me, Daddy?" Meanwhile, Joan hears of Peggy's mistreatment of Lois and decides the put the new copier in Peggy's office making it crowded with secretaries.

Head of Account Services, Duck Phillips, urges Roger to hire some younger people in creative to better market to younger people. Don denigrates the idea that the creative Department needs to have more young people, but Roger insists. The creative team worries about the interviews to hire younger team members, and wonder if Duck is in charge of Don. Don hires two new young employees, ages 24 and 25, both named Smith. While Don is in the elevator leaving work, two young men from another floor get on. They make crude and insulting remarks about women, to the obvious discomfort of a woman riding the elevator. Don forcefully removes one of their hats, teaching them to be more respectful

While driving to pick up Sally from ballet class, Betty's car breaks down. When the tow truck arrives, she flirts with the mechanic and convinces him to lower the price of a new fan belt significantly, so that she can pay for it herself without Don knowing. When she arrives home, she lies to Don about why she was late picking up Sally.

As the episode closes, a pensive Don quotes a poem from Meditations in an Emergency, which he had been reading all episode, and mails a copy to an unknown person, with the note "Made me think of you. –D."

Reception
The episode was received positively by critics at the time. Alan Sepinwall, writing for New Jersey's The Star-Ledger, praised the episode, and the new season of questions it was setting up, saying "Matt Weiner has said that we're going to find out everything in due time; I'm more than willing to wait when the episodes are this strong." Noel Murray, writing for The A.V. Club, was cautiously approving, writing that "If I have one major complaint about this first Season Two episode–aside from my usual complaints that Mad Men can hit its points a little too hard–it's that not much seems to have happened after 15 months. Aside from Betty's transformation into someone less lost and more imperious, the only major hint we get that this is all taking place over a year after the last episode is Don's voice-over quote from an O'Hara poem: 'Now I am quietly waiting for the catastrophe of my personality to become beautiful again.'"

References

External links
 "For Those Who Think Young" at AMC
 

Mad Men (season 2) episodes
2008 American television episodes